The Pomilio FVL-8 was a biplane fighter aircraft built by Fabbrica Aeroplani Ing. O. Pomilio for Engineering Division of the Aviation Section, U.S. Signal Corps.

Development and design
The FVL-8 was constructed of a wood framework, and covered in plywood. The wings were separated from the fuselage by struts. It was powered by a Liberty 8 engine, and armed by two machine guns. Six prototypes were constructed, the first had its first flight in February 1919. No order for production aircraft was received.

Specifications

References

Bibliography

 

1910s United States fighter aircraft
FVL-8
Engineering Division aircraft
Single-engined tractor aircraft
Biplanes
Aircraft first flown in 1919